Lysianka Raion was a raion (administrative district) of Cherkasy Oblast. Its area was 746 square kilometres, and the administrative center was the urban-type settlement of Lysianka. The raion was abolished on 18 July 2020 as part of the administrative reform of Ukraine, which reduced the number of raions of Cherkasy Oblast to four. The area of Lysianka Raion was merged into Zvenyhorodka Raion. The last estimate of the raion population was 

At the time of disestablishment, the raion consisted of three hromadas:
 Buzhanka rural hromada with the administration in the selo of Buzhanka;
 Lysianka settlement hromada with the administration in Lysianka;
 Vynohrad rural hromada with the administration in the selo of Vynohrad.

Population
The population of the Lysianka Raion (as of 2001) was 28,721.

Subdivisions
The Lysianka Raion consisted of 1 town (Lysianka) and 38 villages. The villages of the Lysianka Raion included:

 Bosivka
 Boyarka
 Budysche
 Buzhanka
 Vereschaky
 Vynohrad
 Votylivka
 Ganzhalivka
 Dashukivka
 Dibrivka
 Dubyna
 Zhabyanka
 Zhurzhyntsi
 Kamyanyi Brid
 Kuchkivka
 Maryanivka
 Mykhailivka
 Orly, Ukraine
 Petrivka-Popivka
 Petrivska-Huta
 Pysarivka
 Pohyblyak
 Pochapyntsi
 Ripky
 Rozkoshivka
 Rubanyi Mist
 Semenivka
 Smilchyntsi
 Tyhonivka
 Tovsti Rohy
 Fedyukivka
 Huzhyntsi
 Chaplynka
 Chesnivka
 Shesteryntsi
 Shubyni Stavy
 Shushkivka
 Yablunivka

See also
 Subdivisions of Ukraine

References

External links

  - Everything about Lysianka and Lysianskyi Raion
 Verkhovna Rada website - Administrative divisions of the Lysianskyi Raion

Former raions of Cherkasy Oblast
1923 establishments in Ukraine
Ukrainian raions abolished during the 2020 administrative reform